José Enrique "Quiquito" Meléndez Ortiz (born December 5, 1973) is a Puerto Rican politician affiliated with the New Progressive Party (PNP). He has been a member of the Puerto Rico House of Representatives since May 23, 2011.

Early years and studies

José Enrique Meléndez Ortiz was born on December 5, 1973 in Aibonito, Puerto Rico. His parents are former Senator José Enrique Meléndez Ortiz Sr. and Elba M. Ortiz Santiago.

Meléndez completed his elementary and high school studies in Coamo. He then received a Bachelor's degree in Political Science from the Interamerican University of Puerto Rico. After that, he completed his Juris doctor at the Pontifical Catholic University of Puerto Rico in 2002. After that, he passed the bar exam.

Meléndez served as a regional election coordinator, a regional director, and national committeeman of the Young Republican Federation of Puerto Rico In his youth.

Professional career

In 2002, Meléndez was hired by then-Representative Aníbal Vega Borges to serve as Legislative Adviser to the New Progressive Party at the Puerto Rico House of Representatives. During that time, he also served as adviser to Representatives José Chico Vega and Edwin Mundo Ríos. Also, Thomas Rivera Schatz, then Electoral Commissioner of the PNP, recruited Meléndez as an adviser in electoral affairs. Meléndez continued working for Rivera Schatz becoming his Legal Aide.

From 2003 to 2004, Meléndez also gave legislative and legal advice to Representative José F. Aponte Hernández. On January 10, 2005, Meléndez was appointed unanimously to serve as Secretary of the House of Representatives, under elected Speaker Aponte Hernández. He served in that position until 2006.

Meléndez also works as a private attorney.

Political career

In April 2011, Meléndez Ortiz presented his candidacy to fill the vacant of Rolando Crespo in the House of Representatives. On May 23, 2011, he was sworn into the position. He is currently a member of the Committees of Municipal Affairs, Treasury, Health, Public Safety, and others.

Personal life

Meléndez is married to Mariel Pagán Ramos. They have three children: José Enrique, Enrique José and Enrique André. They live in Guaynabo.

References

External links
José Enrique Meléndez Ortiz on CamaraDeRepresentantes.org

1973 births
Interamerican University of Puerto Rico alumni
Living people
New Progressive Party members of the House of Representatives of Puerto Rico
New Progressive Party (Puerto Rico) politicians
People from Aibonito, Puerto Rico
Pontifical Catholic University of Puerto Rico alumni
Republican Party (Puerto Rico) politicians